Hugh Marlowe (born Hugh Herbert Hipple; January 30, 1911May 2, 1982) was an American film, television, stage and radio actor.

Early life
Marlowe was born in Philadelphia, Pennsylvania.  He was born Hugh Herbert Hipple. He was of primarily English ancestry, his family having been in what is now the northeastern United States since the early colonial period. Hipple had several ancestors on the Mayflower, through his father he was descended from Myles Standish through Standish's son Alexander Standish and he was also descended from Isaac Allerton and Isaac Allerton Jr. and American Revolutionary war hero Ichabod Alden through whom he is descended from John Alden. Through his mother he was descended from John Endecott.

Career

Stage
Marlowe began his stage career in the 1930s at the Pasadena Playhouse in California, first under his birth name, then as John Marlowe. He was first seen on the Broadway stage in New York City in Arrest That Woman (1936), permanently settling on Hugh Marlowe as his stage name. His Broadway appearances included Kiss the Boys Goodbye, The Land Is Bright, Lady in the Dark, Laura, and Duet for Two Hands.

In 1939 and 1940, Marlowe was a voice actor in two network radio programs. He performed the role of Jim Curtis in the soap opera Brenda Curtis, and he played the title character in the first radio version of The Adventures of Ellery Queen.

Film and television
Marlowe was usually a secondary lead or supporting actor in the films he appeared in. His first film was Brilliant Marriage (1936). His films included Meet Me in St. Louis (1944). For a time, he worked regularly for 20th Century Fox, appearing in Twelve O'Clock High (1949), All About Eve (1950), Night and the City (1950), The Day the Earth Stood Still (1951), Rawhide (1951), and Howard Hawks' Monkey Business (1952). His later films include  Earth vs. the Flying Saucers (1956), Elmer Gantry (1960), Birdman of Alcatraz (1962), and Seven Days in May (1964).

Marlowe played a real person, the Reverend William Hyde, in the 1956 episode "Dig or Die, Brother Hyde" of the television  anthology series, Crossroads. In the 1957 episode, "Jhonakehunkga Called Jim", set in 1883, Marlowe plays the Reverend Jacob Stucki, who is dispatched to the mission at the Winnebago reservation. Marlowe guest starred in the 1961 episode "Mayberry on Record" of CBS's The Andy Griffith Show. In 1962, he played the part of Sam Garner in the episode "The Pitchwagon" on CBS's Rawhide.

Marlowe made six guest appearances on CBS's Perry Mason, starring Raymond Burr. Among those roles, he was cast as district attorney and Mason client Brander Harris in "The Case of the Fraudulent Foto," (1959) and as murder victim Commander James Page in "The Case of the Slandered Submarine" (1960). He also played murder victim Ernest Stone in "The Case of the Nebulous Nephew" (1963), a doctor Lambert in "The Case of The Sleepy Slayer" (1963) and murderer Guy Munford in "The Case of the Hasty Honeymooner" (1965). In 1964 Marlowe appeared as Clay Billings on The Virginian in the episode "The Intruders." Marlowe also performed as Donald Burton, a newspaper reporter, on a 1965 episode of Hazel titled "Hazel's Day in Court" and as pretentious TV documentarian Bainbridge Wells in Voyage to the Bottom of the Sea (1966). 

In later years, Marlowe was a regular on the NBC television daytime drama Another World, the last of four actors who portrayed Matthews family patriarch Jim Matthews. Marlowe played the role from 1969 until his death in 1982.

Marlowe bore a marked resemblance to actor Richard Carlson and the two are often mistaken for each other.

Personal life
Marlowe was married three times, each time to an actress. Between 1941 and 1946, he was married to Edith Atwater, between 1946 and 1968 he was married to K.T. Stevens, with whom he had two sons, Jeffrey and Christian. From 1968 to his death, he was married to Rosemary Torri with whom he had one son, Hugh MichaelII. 

Marlowe died in 1982 from a heart attack at the age of 71 and was buried at Ferncliff Cemetery and Mausoleum in Hartsdale, Westchester County, New York.

Partial filmography

Brilliant Marriage (1936) – Richard G. Taylor, III
It Couldn't Have Happened – But It Did (1936) – Edward Forrest
Married Before Breakfast (1937) – Kenneth
Between Two Women (1937) – Priest
Marriage Is a Private Affair (1944) – Joseph I. Murdock
Mrs. Parkington (1944) – John Marbey
Meet Me in St. Louis (1944) – Colonel Darly
Come to the Stable (1949) – Robert 'Bob' Mason
Twelve O'Clock High (1949) – Lt. Col. Ben Gately
Night and the City (1950) – Adam Dunn
All About Eve (1950) – Lloyd Richards
Rawhide (1951) – Rafe Zimmerman
Mr. Belvedere Rings the Bell (1951) – Rev. Charles Watson
The Day the Earth Stood Still (1951) – Tom Stevens
Bugles in the Afternoon (1952) – Capt. Edward Garnett
Diplomatic Courier (1952) – Narrator (voice, uncredited)
Wait till the Sun Shines, Nellie (1952) – Ed Jordan
Monkey Business (1952) – Hank Entwhistle
Way of a Gaucho (1952) – Don Miguel Aleondo
The Stand at Apache River (1953) – Colonel Morsby
Casanova's Big Night (1954) – Stefano Di Gambetta
Garden of Evil (1954) – John Fuller
Illegal (1955) – Ray Borden
World Without End (1956) – John Borden
Earth vs. the Flying Saucers (1956) – Dr. Russell A. Marvin
The Black Whip (1956) – Lorn Crawford
Elmer Gantry (1960) – Rev. Philip Garrison
The Long Rope (1961) – Jonas Stone
Birdman of Alcatraz (1962) – Albert Comstock
13 Frightened Girls (1963) – John Hull
Seven Days in May (1964) – Harold McPherson
Castle of Evil (1966) – 'Doc' Corozal
How to Steal the World (1968) – Grant (archive footage)
The Last Shot You Hear (1969) – Charles Nordeck

Radio appearances
 Lux Radio Theatre (1952) – Episode: "Come to the Stable"

References

External links
 
 
 
 

1911 births
1982 deaths
Male actors from Philadelphia
American male stage actors
American male film actors
American male television actors
American male radio actors
Burials at Ferncliff Cemetery
20th-century American male actors